Subhash Manakchand Zambad  (born 25 April 1962) is an Indian politician who is an elected member of the Maharashtra Legislative Council from Aurangabad Jalna constituency . He is a leader of the Indian National Congress from Maharashtra state

Political career
Subhash Manakchand Zambad was elected to the Legislative Assembly as a Congress candidate in elections held in the October 2013
He is Founder Chairman of Ajanta Urban Co-Op Bank Ltd., Aurangabad. In 1999 he established the Ajintha Co. Op Bank in Aurangabad He was the chairman of Maha. State Housing Corp. Ltd. Mumbai during 2008 – 10. and He was elected as a Vice President of CREDAI Maharashtra in the year 2010.  Also, He has nominated as General Secretary of Maharashtra State Congress Committee in the Year 2016.

References

External links 
Official Website

1962 births
Living people
Maharashtra MLAs 2014–2019
Indian National Congress politicians from Maharashtra
Members of the Maharashtra Legislative Council